An idolator is a practitioner of idolatry.

Idolater or Idolator may also refer to:

Books
Os Idólatras, 1968 Portuguese novel by Maria Judite de Carvalho

Music
 Idolator (website), an American music blog
 Idolator (album), third album by the Japanese metal band Blood Stain Child
 Idolator (Ole i'dole album), a 1986 album by Ole i'dole
 "Idolator", song by King of the Slums from Dandelions (album)
 "Idolater", 1985 single by Opus (Austrian band) from album Solo, reissued on Millenium Edition and Best of Opus